Covent Garden is a district of London.

Covent Garden may also refer to:
Covent Garden, Cambridge, a street in Cambridge, England
Covent Garden Hotel, a hotel in the Covent Garden district
Covent Garden tube station, the underground railway station for the district
Holborn and Covent Garden (ward), an electoral ward covering parts of Covent Garden within the London Borough of Camden
New Covent Garden Market, located in Nine Elms, London, which replaced the old market in Covent Garden in 1974
Royal Opera House, originally the Theatre Royal, Covent Garden

See also
, office building in the Northern Quarter (Brussels)
Covent Garden Festival